Nuriddin Amadbekovich Davronov (born on 16 January 1991) is a Tajik professional footballer who plays as a midfielder for I-League club Real Kashmir and the Tajikistan national team.

Early life
Davronov was born in Dushanbe to artists Ahmadbek Davronov and his mother Shirinmoh Niholova.

Club career

Earlier career
Davronov played for the B team of FC Lokomotiv Moscow in 2008.  After playing one season with Energetik Dushanbe in 2008, he joined FC Istiklol where he played the following 4 seasons having won a number of domestic titles.

Sloboda 
During the winter break of the season 2012–13 he joined Serbian club FK Sloboda Užice. He made his debut for the Sloboda on March 2, 2013, in a 1–0 win against BSK Borča.

Dunav Ruse 
In August 2016, Davronov went on trial with Bulgarian side FC Dunav Ruse, going on to sign a one-year contract with the club on 16 August 2016.

Istiklol loan 
On 7 February 2017, Davronov returned to Istiklol on loan, until 31 July 2017.

Madura United 
In December 2017, Davronov signed for Indonesian Liga 1 side Madura United on a one-year contract. After suffering a season-ending knee injury, Davronov's contract with Madura United was terminated by mutual consent in August 2018.

Oman Club 
On 22 August 2019, Davronov was announced as a new signing for Oman Club.

Second Istiklol loan 
On 11 February 2021, Istiklol announced the return of Davronov on loan from Borneo until after the AFC Champions League group stages in the Summer of 2021. Davronov returned to Borneo when his loan expired on 15 May 2021.

Istiklol return 
On 31 March 2022, FC Istiklol announced the return of Davronov.

Mohammedan 
In June 2022, Davronov moved to India and signed with I-League club Mohammedan. On 16 August, he made his debut for the club against Goa in the Durand Cup, which ended in a 3–1 comeback win. He made his I-League debut on 12 November in their 1–0 defeat to Gokulam Kerala. On 26 December 2022, Davronov's contract was terminated by mutual agreement with immediate effect.

Real Kashmir 
On 5 January 2023, it was officially announced that I-League side Real Kashmir has roped in Davronov till the end of the season.

International career
Davronov appeared at the 2007 FIFA U-17 World Cup held in South Korea. He has been playing for the senior side since 2008. He played with Tajikistan in the 2008 AFC Challenge Cup where they finished as runners-up by losing to India in final.

Career statistics

Club

International

Statistics accurate as of match played 16 November 2022

International goals

Honours

Istiqlol
Tajik League: 2010, 2011, 2014, 2015, 2017
Tajik Cup: 2009, 2010, 2011, 2014
Tajik Super Cup: 2010, 2011, 2012, 2014, 2015, 2016, 2021, 2022
AFC President's Cup: 2012

Mohammedan Sporting
CFL Premier Division A: 2022

Tajikistan
AFC Challenge Cup runner-up: 2008

References

External links

 Nuriddin Davronov at Srbijafudbal

1991 births
Living people
Sportspeople from Dushanbe
Tajikistani footballers
Tajikistan international footballers
Tajikistani expatriate footballers
FK Sloboda Užice players
FC Istiklol players
FC Dunav Ruse players
Madura United F.C. players
Oman Club players
Borneo F.C. players
Persita Tangerang players
Mohammedan SC (Kolkata) players
Tajikistan Higher League players
Serbian SuperLiga players
First Professional Football League (Bulgaria) players
Liga 1 (Indonesia) players
Oman Professional League players
I-League players
Expatriate footballers in Serbia
Expatriate footballers in Bulgaria
Expatriate footballers in Indonesia
Expatriate footballers in Oman
Expatriate footballers in India
Tajikistani expatriate sportspeople in Indonesia
Tajikistani expatriate sportspeople in India
Footballers at the 2014 Asian Games
Association football midfielders
Asian Games competitors for Tajikistan
Tajikistan youth international footballers